Lennox Berkeley composed his Symphony No. 2 in 1958. The work was commissioned by the City of Birmingham Symphony, who premiered it under Andrzej Panufnik in February 1959. Berkeley revised the symphony in 1976 for its first recording, by the London Philharmonic under Nicholas Braithwaite.

Structure

The composition is in four movements: 
 Lento – Allegro
 Allegro vivace
 Lento
 Allegro

Typical playing time is around 27 minutes

References
Notes

Sources
 

Berkeley 2
1958 compositions
Compositions by Lennox Berkeley